Khadizatul Anwar is a Bangladesh Awami League politician and a Member of the Bangladesh Parliament from a reserved seat.

Biography 
Khadizatul Anwar Sony was born to Awami League politician & former MP Rafiqul Anwar. She was elected to parliament from Chittagong District representing the Reserved Women's Seat–19 in 2019.

References

Awami League politicians
Living people
Women members of the Jatiya Sangsad
11th Jatiya Sangsad members
21st-century Bangladeshi women politicians
21st-century Bangladeshi politicians
1985 births